"Volví" (English: "I came back/I've returned") is a song by the American bachata group Aventura and Puerto Rican rapper Bad Bunny. It was released on August 3, 2021 by Rimas Entertainment. "Volví" blends bachata and reggaeton, with a merengue típico outro, along with some elements of pop and ballad. It reached number 22 on the US Billboard Hot 100, becoming the group's highest-charting song in the country.

Background and composition
In early August 2021, Aventura shared a preview of the song on Twitter, announcing the collaboration, with Bad Bunny posting stills from the video as well as a photo of him with the members of Aventura on his Instagram page.

"Volví" combines bachata guitar licks with reggaeton drums. The outro is merengue típico, played on güira, tambora, and guitar. The lyrics feature themes of intimacy and jealousy, telling the story of a person who wants to come back with an ex.

Reception
Zoe Haylock of Vulture.com commended the collaboration, "not just for bringing together crushes past and present but for combining the two genres from each country." In Remezcla, Jennifer Mota compared the genre blending to "Ella y Yo", by Aventura featuring Don Omar, "for today's pop audience".

Commercially, "Volví" reached number 22 on the US Billboard Hot 100, becoming the group's highest-charting song in the country. It also marked Aventura's third number-one on the US Hot Latin Songs, and first since "Dile al Amor" in 2010, while becoming Bad Bunny's ninth chart-topper. The song reached number 11 on the Billboard Global 200 chart.

Music video
The music video was released on August 3, 2021, along with the song. In the video, Aventura and Bad Bunny perform the song on a "packed" dance floor, while a couple who dances together leaves for an intimate space at the end of the night.

Live performance
On August 14, 2021, Aventura and Bad Bunny performed the song live for the first time at the Hard Rock Stadium in Miami.

Charts

Weekly charts

Year-end charts

Certifications

See also
List of Billboard number-one Latin songs of 2021

References

2021 singles
2021 songs
Aventura (band) songs
Bad Bunny songs
Bachata songs
Spanish-language songs
Songs written by Bad Bunny
Songs written by Romeo Santos